Robert Kevin Blewett (born 30 March 1943) is an Australian former cricketer. He played 25 first-class and three List A matches for South Australia between 1975 and 1979. He is the father of Australian former Test cricketer Greg Blewett.

References

External links
 

1943 births
Living people
Australian cricketers
South Australia cricketers
Cricketers from Adelaide